= Peridinetosoma =

Scientific classification
- Kingdom: Animalia
- Phylum: Arthropoda
- Clade: Pancrustacea
- Class: Insecta
- Order: Coleoptera
- Suborder: Polyphaga
- Infraorder: Cucujiformia
- Superfamily: Curculionoidea
- Family: Curculionidae
- Genus: Peridinetosoma; Voss, E., 1940
- Species: P. maculaalba

Binomial name
- Peridinetosoma maculaalba Voss, 1940

Genus of weevils

Peridinetosoma is a monotypic genus of weevils. The only species assigned to this genus is Peridinetosoma maculaalba.
